Johann Eisl (born 23 October 1950) is an Austrian former sailor. He competed in the Flying Dutchman event at the 1976 Summer Olympics.

References

External links
 

1950 births
Living people
Austrian male sailors (sport)
Olympic sailors of Austria
Sailors at the 1976 Summer Olympics – Flying Dutchman
People from Salzburg-Umgebung District
Sportspeople from Salzburg (state)